The Dumfries Burghs by-election was a Parliamentary by-election held on 20 July 1909. The constituency returned one Member of Parliament (MP) to the House of Commons of the United Kingdom, elected by the first past the post voting system.

Vacancy
John Gulland had been Liberal MP for the seat of Dumfries Burghs since the 1906 general election. On 5 July 1909, he was appointed as a Junior Lord of the Treasury, which meant, in accordance with the times, that he was required to resign his seat and seek re-election to parliament.

Electoral history
The seat had been Liberal since the party was created. They easily held the seat at the last election, with an increased majority;

Candidates
The local Liberal Association re-selected 45-year-old John Gulland to defend the seat. 
The Conservatives chose Bryce Duncan as their candidate.

Campaign
Polling Day was fixed for 20 July 1909.

Result
The Liberals held the seat with a reduced majority;

Aftermath
Gulland retained the seat at the following general election;

References

History of Dumfriesshire
Dumfries Burghs by-election
1900s elections in Scotland
Dumfries Burghs by-election
Dumfries Burghs by-election
By-elections to the Parliament of the United Kingdom in Scottish constituencies
Politics of Dumfries and Galloway